John Lawrence was  an English Anglican priest in the 16th century.

A Fellow of All Souls College, Oxford, he was  Archdeacon of Wilts from 1554 until his deprivation a decade later.

Notes

16th-century English Anglican priests
Archdeacons of Wilts
Fellows of All Souls College, Oxford